Rebecca Louise Law (born in 1980) is a British installation artist, best known for artworks created with natural materials, namely flora.

Life
She was born in 1980 and grew up in a small village in the UK.  After graduating high school she trained at the Newcastle University's School of Arts and Cultures in England.

The physicality and sensuality of her work plays with the relationship between humanity and nature. Law is passionate about natural change and preservation, allowing her work to evolve as nature takes its course and offering an alternative concept of beauty.

Exhibitions 
Notable commissions include ‘The Grecian Garden’ (Onassis Cultural Centre, Athens), ‘The Beauty of Decay’ (Chandran Gallery, San Francisco), ‘Life in Death’ (Shirley Sherwood Gallery, London) and 'Community' (The Toledo Museum of Art). Law's work has also been exhibited by Bo. Lee Gallery, Broadway Studio & Gallery, NOW Gallery and at sites such as the Royal Academy of Arts, Chaumont-Sur-Loire and the Victoria & Albert Museum.

References

External links 

 https://www.rebeccalouiselaw.com

British installation artists
Living people
Place of birth missing (living people)
English contemporary artists
English women artists
1980 births
20th-century English women
20th-century English people
21st-century English women
21st-century English people